Alexandra Eade (born 15 January 1998) is a retired Australian artistic gymnast.

Eade competed at the 2018 Commonwealth Games where she won a gold medal in the floor event and a bronze medal in the team all-around event.

She is currently studying a bachelor of biomedical science at Deakin University.

References

External links

1997 births
Living people
Australian female artistic gymnasts
Gymnasts at the 2018 Commonwealth Games
Commonwealth Games medallists in gymnastics
Commonwealth Games gold medallists for Australia
Commonwealth Games bronze medallists for Australia
21st-century Australian women
Medallists at the 2018 Commonwealth Games